Orle  is a village in the administrative district of Gmina Liniewo, within Kościerzyna County, Pomeranian Voivodeship, in northern Poland. It is located in the historic region of Pomerania.

The village has a population of 488.

History
During the German occupation of Poland (World War II), Orle was one of the sites of executions of Poles, carried out by the Germans in 1939 as part of the Intelligenzaktion, and Poles from Orle were also executed in the forest between Skarszewy and Więckowy.

References

Villages in Kościerzyna County
Nazi war crimes in Poland